The inauguration of Hakainde Hichilema as the 7th President of Zambia was  held on 24 August 2021. President-elect Hichilema won by a landslide with over 996,000 votes between him and the Incumbent president Edgar Lungu who got 1,814, 201 votes in the August 2021 presidential election. Hakainde Hichilema took the oath alongside Mutale Nalumango as the Vice-president of Zambia. The venue for the inauguration was National Heroes Stadium in Lusaka. Attendance was supposed  to be  restricted to invited guests only due to the Covid-19 preventive protocols, but was later made open to the public resulting in a filled out stadium The day of the inauguration was declared a public holiday in Zambia by president Edgar Lungu.

Dignitaries

References 

Hakainde Hichilema
2021 in Zambian politics
Hakainde Hichilema
August 2021 events in Africa